Christopher James Pile (born 4 April 1967) is an English former footballer whose career was curtailed by injury.

A goalkeeper, Pile never actually made a professional appearance, and in fact only made the bench for one senior game. Uniquely, however, this game was the 1985 European Cup Final, which saw him become the youngest footballer to be involved in this fixture, generally considered to be the biggest in club football.

Pile came through the Liverpool youth system, and signed professional forms in 1984 at the age of 17. Initially fourth-choice 'keeper, injuries to Bob Wardle and then Bob Bolder elevated Pile to second place (behind Bruce Grobbelaar) and saw him facing a possible European Cup winner's medal having just turned 18. Pile was indeed named on the bench for the final, but Liverpool lost to Juventus in a game overshadowed by the Heysel Disaster.

He joined Tranmere Rovers and then Bury as a non-contract player, playing reserve team football and impressed sufficiently at Bury to be offered a contract. Unfortunately, though, the deal was scuppered when he broke his wrist on the day of signing. Needing regular football, he accepted an offer to move to New Zealand, a move that he initially expected to be short-term. However, he settled so well, playing for Wellington side Waterside Karori, that he was able to ignore reported interest from Scottish giants Celtic. A couple of years later, personal reasons saw him return to England, and he joined Southport, where he had some success until he suffered a broken hand, the third of his career. This caused him to quit playing, and he returned to New Zealand where he has remained to this day.
Chris is one of New Zealand's top goalkeeper coaches working over the past 20 plus years with New Zealand Under 17s & 20s, two spells with Wellington Phoenix in the Australia A-League, Team Wellington in the New Zealand National League and a number of clubs in Wellington.
Chris finished his goalkeeper coaching career at Waterside Karori were he started his playing career in New Zealand.

Chris can now be heard across the air waves of Australia & New Zealand radio as he works as an expert analyst in the Australian A-League.

References

External links
Article at LFCHistory.net

1967 births
Living people
People from Huyton
English footballers
Association football goalkeepers
Liverpool F.C. players
Tranmere Rovers F.C. players
Bury F.C. players
Southport F.C. players
English expatriate sportspeople in New Zealand
Waterside Karori players
English expatriate footballers